Hide and Seek  is a 2005 American psychological thriller film starring Robert De Niro and Dakota Fanning. It was directed by John Polson. Albert Hughes was initially set to direct, making his debut as a solo director, but left due to creative differences.

The film opened in the United States on January 28, 2005, and grossed $127 million worldwide. Rotten Tomatoes cited praise for De Niro and Fanning for their performances, though its consensus called the film "derivative, illogical and somewhat silly". Fanning received an MTV Movie Award for Best Frightened Performance in 2005.

Plot
Following his discovery of the body of his wife Alison in a bathtub after her apparent suicide, Dr. David Callaway, a psychologist, decides to move with his 9-year-old daughter Emily to upstate New York. There, Emily makes an imaginary friend she calls "Charlie". Her friendship with Charlie begins to disturb David when he discovers their cat dead in the bathtub, who Emily claims was a victim of "Charlie". David has nightmares of the New Year's Eve party that occurred the night before Alison's death.

When a family friend, Dr. Katherine Carson, comes to visit David, Emily reveals that she and Charlie have a mutual desire to upset her father. David meets Elizabeth Young, a local woman, and her niece, Amy, who is the same age as Emily. Hoping to cultivate a healthy friendship for Emily, David sets up a play date. Amy is eager to become friends and gives one of her dolls to Emily but the play date is spoiled when Emily cuts up Amy's doll's face. Emily tells David she doesn't need any friends.

David invites Elizabeth over to dinner one night, where Emily acts hostile toward her. Elizabeth later tries to make peace with Emily. When Emily tells her that she is playing hide-and-seek with Charlie, Elizabeth indulges her by pretending to look for Charlie. When she opens the closet, someone bursts out and pushes her out the window to her death.

David asks Emily what happened. Emily claims Charlie killed Elizabeth and forced Emily to help him move the body. She tells David the location of the body. David discovers Elizabeth in the bathtub full of blood (similar to how Alison died). Armed with a knife, he goes outside, where he meets their neighbor and assumes that his neighbor is Charlie. He cuts the neighbor and the neighbor calls the police.

Back in the house, David finds that, although he has been in his study many times, the boxes were actually never unpacked after the move. He realizes that he has dissociative identity disorder and Charlie is not imaginary at all: "Charlie" is David himself. Whenever "Charlie" would emerge, David would be in his study. He also finally recalls the New Year's Eve party the night before his wife's death. He had caught Alison making out with another guest. "Charlie" was created as a way to express David's rage so that he could murder his wife, something the docile David was too decent to do. Emily knew the entire time about her father's split personality but did not tell him because she was unsure which personality murdered her mother until "Charlie" killed Elizabeth.

Once David realizes the truth, he becomes completely consumed by Charlie, leading him to murder the local sheriff, who arrives to investigate the neighbor. Emily calls Katherine for help, tricks Charlie, and escapes into the cave where she originally met Charlie. Katherine takes the gun from the dead sheriff and finds Charlie in the cave. He pretends to be David and attacks Katherine. Katherine begs for David to fight his murderous other personality. Charlie says David no longer exists. Emily emerges, begging Charlie to let Katherine go. Her distraction allows Katherine to shoot Charlie, killing him at last.

Later, Emily is preparing for school in her new life with Katherine. But Emily's drawing of herself with two heads suggests that she might also have dissociative identity disorder.

Endings

This film has a total of five different endings, The US theatrical version had the following ending:

Preparing for school while living a new life with Katherine, Emily draws a picture of herself and Katherine, looking happy. But when the camera cuts back to Emily's drawing, Emily has two heads suggesting she now has dissociative identity disorder. This ending is included as an alternate ending on DVDs featuring the International theatrical ending.
Another four were included on the DVD:

Happy Drawing: The same as the ending in the US theatrical version, except that the drawing Emily makes of herself has only one head, suggesting that she does not have dissociative identity disorder.

One Final Game: Emily is shown seemingly in a new apartment bedroom, and Katherine's actions mirror that of her mother's at the beginning of the film. She reassures her love to Emily and begins to leave the room. Emily asks Katherine to leave the door open, but Katherine insists she cannot. As the door shuts, a protected window is visible on the door. The next cut is of Katherine locking the door from the outside, revealing this assumed apartment bedroom is actually a hospital room in a children's psychiatric ward. Emily gets out of bed and does a Hide and Seek countdown. She nears the closet, opens, and smiles at her own reflection in the mirror.

Emily's Fate (International theatrical ending): Same as above in the psychiatric ward, but without the Hide and Seek countdown. This ending was featured in the international theatrical version.

Life with Katherine: An ending similar to that in the psychiatric ward, but in this ending Emily is not in a ward but her new home. After Katherine shuts the door, Emily gets out of bed to play Hide and Seek with her own reflection.

On the DVD, the main menu enables you to watch the film with any one of the five endings.

Main cast
 Robert De Niro as David Callaway/Charlie 
 Dakota Fanning as Emily Callaway
 Famke Janssen as Dr. Katherine "Kate" Carson
 Elisabeth Shue as Elizabeth Young
 Amy Irving as Allison Callaway
 Dylan Baker as Sheriff Hafferty
 Melissa Leo as Laura
 Robert John Burke as Steven

Release
20th Century Fox released two versions of the film: the international version and the domestic version. Both versions received different endings. The domestic version was released in the US, while the international version was released to other countries. Both the international and domestic versions submitted to the BBFC were actually released to UK cinemas. Both versions passed for a 15 certificate for "moderate horror and violence". The film was released on DVD on July 5, 2005, in the US and on July 25, 2005, in the UK.

Reception

Box office
In its opening weekend in US theaters, the film grossed $21 million. The film grossed $51.1 million in the U.S. and $71.5 million internationally, for a worldwide total of $122.7 million.

Critical response 
On Rotten Tomatoes the film holds an approval rating of 13% based on 158 reviews, and an average rating of 3.9/10. The website's critical consensus reads: "Robert De Niro and especially Dakota Fanning have earned some praise for their work in Hide and Seek, but critics have called the rest of the film derivative, illogical and somewhat silly." On Metacritic the film has a weighted average score of 35 out of 100, based on 34 critics, indicating "generally unfavorable reviews". Audiences polled by CinemaScore gave the film an average grade of "B−" on an A+ to F scale.

BBC Movies gave the film two stars out of five, commenting that "Robert De Niro continues his long slide into mediocrity with yet another charmless psycho-thriller." Roger Ebert of the Chicago Sun-Times gave the film two stars out of four: "There was a point in the movie when suddenly everything clicked, and the Law of Economy of Characters began to apply. That is the law that says no actor is in a movie unless his character is necessary." According to the New York Times the film was hampered by budgetary restrictions and the Toronto Sun said it was one of De Niro's worst.

Accolades

See also

Twist ending

References

External links
 
 
 
 
 
 

2005 films
2005 horror films
2000s mystery films
2005 psychological thriller films
2000s psychological horror films
American mystery films
American psychological horror films
German mystery films
English-language German films
Films about dissociative identity disorder
Films about imaginary friends
Films scored by John Ottman
Films set in psychiatric hospitals
Films set in New York (state)
Films shot in New York (state)
Films shot in New Jersey
American serial killer films
20th Century Fox films
Films directed by John Polson
Uxoricide in fiction
2000s English-language films
2000s American films
2000s German films